Ken Rocco is a former member of the Ohio House of Representatives, and a current member of the Cuyahoga County Court of Appeals.

Rocco holds a bachelor's degree from Ohio University and a law degree from Case Western Reserve University.  He was Parma City Prosecutor before his election to the state house of Representatives.

References

Living people
Democratic Party members of the Ohio House of Representatives
Ohio University alumni
Case Western Reserve University alumni
Ohio lawyers
Year of birth missing (living people)